GHU may refer to:
 Gualeguaychú Airport, in Argentina
 Gwangju Health University, in South Korea